Heaton Mersey railway station served the Heaton Mersey district of Stockport between 1880 and 1961.

History

Heaton Mersey railway station was opened on 1 January 1880 by the Midland Railway and lay on the newly opened Manchester South District Line which ran from Heaton Mersey East Junction to Chorlton Junction and on to Manchester Central station.

The station was situated at the southern end of Station Road which still exists. The station was later operated by the London Midland and Scottish Railway and was closed by the London Midland Region of British Railways on 3 July 1961.

The main station building was a substantial brick-built structure located on the east (southbound) side of the line. A footbridge led across the twin railway tracks to the northbound platform which was provided with a smaller brick-built shelter. Station staff could use a wooden boarded crossing at the north end of the facility.

Train services
The station was served by local trains from Manchester Central to Cheadle Heath and to Stockport Tiviot Dale; also by secondary stopping trains from Derby.  These continued to run after the closure of the station until 1967, with line closing to all traffic two years later.

The site today

No trace remains of the station or the line - all the structures were demolished after the track was lifted in 1970, whilst the cutting in which the station sat was  subsequently filled in.

References

External links
Heaton Mersey Station on navigable 1948 O.S. map
Heaton Mersey Station at Disused Stations Site Record

Disused railway stations in the Metropolitan Borough of Stockport
Former Midland Railway stations
Railway stations in Great Britain opened in 1880
Railway stations in Great Britain closed in 1961
Manchester South District Line